Bruce Lee Fleisher (October 16, 1948 – September 23, 2021) was an American professional golfer.

Early years and amateur career
Fleisher was born in Union City, Tennessee, and was Jewish.

In 1950, the Fleisher family moved to Wilmington, North Carolina, where Bruce began playing golf with his brothers, Leslie and Jerry. When Bruce was 14, the Fleishers moved to Miami, Florida.

Amateur career
Fleisher became involved in golf at age seven by working as a caddie with his two brothers. Fleisher attended Miami-Dade Junior College and Furman University. In 1968 at age 19, he became the third-youngest player to win the U.S. Amateur. He also was the low amateur at the 1969 Masters Tournament. He turned professional in 1969.

Professional career
Fleisher won both individual and team gold medals in golf at the 1969 Maccabiah Games in Israel.

Fleisher spent much of his regular career as a club professional; he won the PGA Club Professional Championship in 1989. His regular tournament career was modest, with one win on the PGA Tour, the 1991 New England Classic, and a few wins in minor tournaments.

He was much more successful on the Champions Tour (now PGA Tour Champions) with 18 wins, including one senior major, the 2001 U.S. Senior Open. Fleisher became the first player ever to earn back-to-back victories in his first two Champions Tour events, which helped him win Player of the Year and Rookie of the Year awards in 1999. He also has one win on the European Seniors Tour, which came in 2000 at the Irish Seniors Open.

He served as head coach for the USA Open Golf Team at the 1989 Maccabiah Games and the 2013 Maccabiah Games in Israel.

Personal life
Fleisher and his wife Wendy lived in the Palm Beach Gardens, Florida, area. In 2017, he was inducted into the Greater Wilmington (North Carolina) Sports Hall of Fame.

Fleisher died of cancer at age 72 on September 23, 2021.

Amateur wins
1968 U.S. Amateur

Professional wins (35)

PGA Tour wins (1)

PGA Tour playoff record (1–0)

Latin American and Caribbean wins (6)
1971 Brazil Open
1980 Panama Open
1986 Jamaica Open
1990 Jamaica Open, Bahamas Open, Chevrolet Classic

Other wins (9)
1977 Little Crosby Pro-Am
1980 Florida Open
1981 South Florida PGA Championship
1987 Florida Open, South Florida PGA Championship
1989 PGA Club Professional Championship
1993 Pebble Beach Invitational
2015 Bass Pro Shops Legends of Golf (Legends division, with Larry Nelson)
2016 Bass Pro Shops Legends of Golf (Legends division, with Larry Nelson)

Champions Tour wins (18)

Champions Tour playoff record (1–2)

European Senior Tour wins (1)

Playoff record
Ben Hogan Tour playoff record (0–1)

Results in major championships

LA = Low amateur
CUT = missed the half-way cut (3rd round cut in 1969 Open Championship)
"T" indicates a tie for a place

Champions Tour major championships

Wins (1)

Maccabiah Games
Fleisher won a gold medal at the 1969 Maccabiah Games in Israel, and he coached the U.S. golf team at the 1989 Games.

U.S. national team appearances
Amateur
Eisenhower Trophy: 1968 (winners)
Walker Cup: 1969 (winners)

Professional
PGA Cup: 1990 (winners)

See also
1971 PGA Tour Qualifying School graduates
1994 PGA Tour Qualifying School graduates
1997 PGA Tour Qualifying School graduates
List of golfers with most PGA Tour Champions wins
List of Jewish golfers

References

External links

American male golfers
Furman Paladins men's golfers
PGA Tour golfers
PGA Tour Champions golfers
Winners of senior major golf championships
Jewish golfers
Golfers from Tennessee
Maccabiah Games medalists in golf
Maccabiah Games gold medalists for the United States
Competitors at the 1969 Maccabiah Games
Jewish American sportspeople
People from Union City, Tennessee
1948 births
2021 deaths
21st-century American Jews